Userkare Khendjer was the twenty-first pharaoh of the Thirteenth Dynasty of Egypt during the Second Intermediate Period. Khendjer possibly reigned for four to five years, archaeological attestations show that he was on the throne for at least three or four years three months and five days. Khendjer had a small pyramid built for himself in Saqqara and it is therefore likely that his capital was in Memphis.

Chronological position

The exact chronological position of Khendjer in the Thirteenth Dynasty is not known for certain owing to uncertainties affecting earlier kings of the dynasty.

Turin King List
The Turin King List mentions Khendjer in between Sekhemre Khutawy Sobekhotep and ...kare Imyremeshaw.

7:19 The Dual King Sekhemre Khutawy Sobekhotep reigned x years ...

7:20 The Dual King Userkare Khendjer, x years ...

7:21 The Dual King ...kara Imyremeshaw, 4 days

Theories
Egyptologist Darrell Baker makes him the twenty-first king of the dynasty, Ryholt sees him as the twenty-second king and Jürgen von Beckerath places him as the seventeenth pharaoh of the dynasty. Furthermore, the identity of his predecessor is still debated: Baker and Ryholt believe it was Wegaf, but that pharaoh is confused with Khaankhre Sobekhotep, so that it is not known which one of the two founded the Thirteenth Dynasty and which one was Khendjer's predecessor.

Reign
The highest attested date for Khendjer's reign is the fourth month of the season of the Inundation), day 15 in his fifth regnal year. Kim Ryholt notes that two dated control notes on stone blocks from his unfinished pyramid complex give him a minimum reign of 3 or 4 years 3 months and 5 days. The aforementioned control notes are dated to Year 1 I Akhet day 10 and Year 5 IV Akhet day 15 of his reign. In these control notes, the names of three officials involved in building the pyramid are also identified. They are the chamberlain of the palace, Senebtyfy, the chamberlain Ameny and the chamberlain, Shebenu. The latter is also attested by other sources.

Several absolute dates have been proposed for his reign, depending on the scholar: 1764—1759 BC as proposed by Ryholt and Baker, 1756—1751 BC as reported by Redford, and 1718—1712 BC as per Schneider.

Pyramid 

Khendjer is known primarily from his pyramid complex excavated by G. Jequier at Saqqara which was perhaps completed as a pyramidion was found. There was found a fragment of a canopic jar, which offers a partial name for his queen, Seneb ... "which may be restored as Sonb[henas]." Other objects with the name of the king are a stela from Abydos recording building projects by the king at the Osiris temple at Abydos, and naming the vizier Ankhu. Another stela once in Liverpool (destroyed in World War II), provides the name of the king's son "Khedjer". He might be a son of the king. Other objects with his name, according to the list provided by Ryholt, include three cylinder-seals from Athribis, a tile found near el-Lisht, scarab seals and an axe blade.

Theories 
The name Khendjer is poorly attested in Egyptian. Khendjer "has been interpreted as a foreign name hnzr and equated with the Semitic personal name h(n)zr, [for] "boar" according to the Danish Egyptologist Kim Ryholt. He notes that this identification is confirmed by the fact that the name h(n)zr is written as hzr in a variant spelling of this king's name on a seal from this king's reign. Ryholt states that the word 'boar' is: 
 attested as huzīru in Akkadian, hinzīr in Arabic, hazīrā in Aramaic, hazīr in Hebrew (the name is attested as hēzīr in I Chron. 24:15, Neh. 10:20) hu-zi-ri in the Nuzi texts, hnzr in Ugarit, and perhaps hi-zi-ri in Amorite.
Khendjer was, therefore, the earliest known Semitic king of a native Egyptian dynasty. Khendjer's prenomen or throne name, Userkare, translates as "The Soul of Re is Powerful."

Khendjer, however, may have had a second prenomen at his coronation: 'Nimaatre' which translates as 'The one who belongs to Maat is Re.' This name appears together with the name Khendjer at the top of the stela of Amenyseneb (Louvre C11).

References

18th-century BC Pharaohs
Pharaohs of the Thirteenth Dynasty of Egypt